Currency Creek (postcode 5214) is a township and locality in South Australia on the western shore of Lake Alexandrina about 6 km north of Goolwa, beside a seasonal stream bearing the same name – Currency Creek – which flows into Lake Alexandrina. The locality includes the headland named Finniss Point which separates the mouths of Currency Creek and the Finniss River.

History
Parts of Lake Alexandrina near to Currency Creek were initially explored by Charles Sturt in an open boat in 1830 but he did not sight the creek.

In December 1837, while exploring the Lake and Murray Mouth looking for other outlets to the sea, a party led by Thomas Bewes Strangways and Young Bingham Hutchinson discovered the waterway while using a whaleboat borrowed from the Encounter Bay fishery. The whaleboat, which in September 1837 had been sold off the schooner Currency Lass at Adelaide, bore the same name as its mother ship, and they named the creek in honour of this boat. They reported on the good grassland in the area and its potential for agriculture.

The township was surveyed in the Currency Creek Special Survey of 1840 but it never really thrived due to the nearness of Goolwa. During the later 1800s the district supported many market gardens along the fertile river flats. The Currency Creek Cemetery contains many historic gravestones. It is notably large compared to the township for the reason that it has serviced the entire district for well over a century.

Boundaries for the locality were created on 31 August 2000 for the "long established name" and include the Government Town of Currency Creek

Wine industry

Currency Creek lends its name to a wine region that stretches from Port Elliot in the west, to Lake Alexandrina to the east, and includes Hindmarsh Island. The main grape varieties grown are Chardonnay, Sauvignon blanc, Cabernet Sauvignon and Shiraz. Vineyards were first established in the area in 1969, with the region producing its first vintage in 1972.

Currency Creek Arboretum
The Currency Creek Arboretum is named after the nearby geographical feature and town. Founded privately by Dean Nicolle and supported by volunteers, it is being developed as a specialist eucalypt (Angophora, Eucalyptus and Corymbia) arboretum with its main purpose being research into Australia's most dominant natural group of plants, the eucalypts.

See also
Currency Creek Game Reserve
Scott Conservation Park
Scott Keach

Gallery
Memorials to River Murray pioneers at Currency Creek cemetery include:

See also Murray–Darling steamboat people

References

External links
Headstones of the Currency Creek cemetery
Currency Creek at Manning Index of South Australian history

Towns in South Australia